Shippingsport Bridge has been the name of four similarly-located bridges over the Illinois River in LaSalle Township, LaSalle County, Illinois: an early bridge about which not much is known, an 1872 swing span bridge, a 1929 vertical-lift bridge nearby, and a 2003 bridge in the same location as the 1929 bridge.  The fourth bridge still exists and carries Illinois Route 351 (IL 351).

History
The Shippingsport Bridge historically carried traffic for U.S. Route 51 (US 51), a major north–south highway between Wisconsin and New Orleans. A bypass was built around Peru and La Salle in 1958. The bypass took the designation of US 51, leaving the Shippingsport Bridge being US 51 Business. Interstate 39 (I-39) was extended south to the Peru and LaSalle area in 1987. I-39 featured the  Abraham Lincoln Memorial Bridge just east of Shippingsport. I-39 ended when it merged into the US 51 bypass south of town. At that time, the old US 51 bypass was turned back to the state of Illinois and was given the designation IL 251. US 51 Business, which used the Shippingsport Bridge, was given the designation IL 351.

Namesake
The bridge is named for the failed settlement of Shippingsport, Illinois, located just west of present-day Oglesby.

First bridge
All that is known of the first bridge is that it was demolished in 1872.

Second bridge
The second bridge to be built in this location was a swing span completed in 1872.

Third bridge

The third bridge, opened on November 7, 1929, was a  multi-span truss bridge with a lift span across the main navigation channel.

It cost $500,000 to build, and opened on November 7, 1929.

Third bridge
Due to navigation requirements, the new bridge had to be located in the same spot as the 1929 bridge.  The result is that the old bridge was removed before the new bridge could be built. This resulted in the river crossing being closed for 2 years from late 2001 to October 29, 2003. That was 1 year shorter than planned due to the bridge being built much faster than was expected.

The fourth bridge cost $16,000,000 to construct.  The new Shippingsport Bridge uses a newly developed high-performance steel. This allowed for thinner girders that could carry across a longer span. This resulted in the need for fewer piers, and gives the bridge a thin, graceful profile. Edward Kreamer & Sons was responsible for the replacement of the bridge.

See also
 
 
 
 List of bridges documented by the Historic American Engineering Record in Illinois

References

Further reading

External links

Bridges over the Illinois River
Bridges completed in 1872
Bridges completed in 1929
Bridges completed in 2003
Bridges in LaSalle County, Illinois
Historic American Engineering Record in Illinois
Vertical lift bridges in Illinois
U.S. Route 51
Steel bridges in the United States
Girder bridges in the United States
Road bridges in Illinois